Hardinsburg can refer to some places in the United States:

Hardinsburg, Indiana, a town in Washington County
Hardinsburg, Dearborn County, Indiana, an unincorporated place
Hardinsburg, Kentucky, a city